Vanessa Theme Ament (born January 8, 1955 in Glendale, California) is an American author, academic, Foley artist, and musician, best known for her 2009 book The Foley Grail, one of the first monographs about the craft of Foley sound in movies and television. She currently teaches telecommunications at Ball State University.

As a Foley artist, Ament has worked on such shows as Knots Landing, Dallas, and Cagney & Lacey, and such films as Prizzi's Honor, Platoon, Predator, Die Hard, Beauty and the Beast, Noises Off..., Batman Returns, and A Goofy Movie.

In addition to her work in Hollywood, Ament has taught at such universities as DePaul University, Georgia State University, Ball State University, Columbia College Chicago, and Cuesta College) since 2001.  She received graduate degrees from Starr King School for the Ministry (1990) as well as from Georgia State University.  In 2004 she released a jazz CD entitled Working Without a Net.  She also lent her voice and songwriting to the 1999 film Foreign Correspondents, which featured her song "Every Other Night."

References

External links

1955 births
Living people
Singers from California
Special effects people
Songwriters from California
Writers from California
DePaul University people
Ball State University faculty
Starr King School for the Ministry alumni
Whittier College alumni
Georgia State University alumni
People from Glendale, California